Brooke Allison Brodack (born April 7, 1986), known online as Brookers, is one of the earliest YouTubers. Brodack, a receptionist from Holden, Massachusetts, first began uploading short comedy skits to YouTube in September 2005. She was offered a contract from NBC show host Carson Daly in 2006, before YouTubers were able to monetize their videos, but nothing came of it. Brodack briefly had the most-subscribed YouTube channel. The New Yorker called her "the first real YouTube star."

Brodack moved in with fellow YouTuber iJustine, but afterwards deleted her channel and moved to Vadodara, India. She relocated to Los Angeles in early 2017.

Early life 
Brodack was born in Putnam, Connecticut. She has been making videos since she was nine years old. Graduating from Wachusett Regional High School, she then attended college at Worcester State College, Quinsigamond Community College and Mount Wachusett Community College, ultimately dropping out of all three. Brodack worked from 2003 to 2006 as a receptionist and hostess at the 99 Restaurant, and she volunteered (2003–2005) for the NEADS program (Dogs for Deaf and Disabled Americans) in Sterling, Massachusetts.

Brodack lived in Holden, Massachusetts with her mother and younger sister, working as a receptionist.

Internet Success

Brodack began posting her short comedic videos on her "Brookers" YouTube channel in September 2005. By June 2006, she was offered an 18-month development contract from Carson Daly, the host of a late night show on NBC, but nothing ever came of it. From July 3 to August 17, 2006, her "Brookers" channel was the most-subscribed on YouTube. She was named a "Crossover Star" by The Wall Street Journal on its New Media Power List on July 29, 2006.

Brookers directed, edited and performed in her early videos, most of which were set at her family home in Holden, Massachusetts. The New Yorker has called her videos "defiantly madcap." Her single-most popular video, "Crazed Numa Fan!!!!", a lip-sync parody of an earlier Internet meme, Numa Numa Dance by Gary Brolsma (itself a parody of "Dragostea din tei" by O-Zone), was viewed on YouTube over 8.2 million  times. Her younger sister, Melissa "Missy" Brodack, performed alongside her in many videos, including "Crazed Numa Fan!!!!"

Her video "Chips," a spoof suspense drama about eating potato chips, was called "brilliant" by Entertainment Weekly, which has listed it among the "great moments in YouTube history."

From August 2006 to April 2007, she played a large role on a Daly-hosted, NBC-sponsored video contest website, It's Your Show TV posting many videos there. She appeared on The Tyra Banks Show (December 6, 2006), as a judge for a student video competition. In February 2007, she appeared alongside other early YouTube stars in "The Sound of Your Voice," a viral music video for Barenaked Ladies.

From May 2007 to March 2008, Brookers had her own web channel, brookebrodack.tv, which was offered through www.me.tv, a new service Daly helped to found. She participated in the 777 (July 7, 2007) YouTube gathering in New York City. In November 2007, she released, "Ozzy's Magical Glasses n' Stuff," a viral video advertisement for a live auction of Ozzy Osbourne items on the Auction Network, for which she was paid "a solid five figures" by the Palisades Media Group.

Later Life

From mid 2013 to early 2017, she lived in Vadodara, India, working on video workshop lectures in collaboration with Design Infinium.

As of February 2017, she relocated to Los Angeles.

On July 12, 2017, Brodack deleted her YouTube account. She also deleted her Twitter and set her Instagram profile to private.

In mid-2018, she returned to YouTube on a new self-titled channel. This channel also no longer exists.

In 2019 Brodack created a new YouTube channel.

See also

 List of YouTubers
 History of YouTube

References

Further reading

Books

Articles and videos

External links
Myspace profile
Youtube profile, old and terminated channel

1986 births
Living people
People from Holden, Massachusetts
People from Putnam, Connecticut
Actresses from Massachusetts
American YouTubers
Comedy YouTubers
Viral videos
YouTube vloggers
21st-century American women
Number-one YouTube channels in subscribers